Frinton-on-Sea is a seaside town and (as just Frinton) a former civil parish, now in the parish of Frinton and Walton, in the Tendring district of Essex, England. In 2018 it had an estimated population of 4,837. In 1931 the parish had a population of 2196.

History

The place-name 'Frinton' is first attested in the Domesday Book of 1086, where it appears as Frientuna. The name may mean 'fenced-in or enclosed town or settlement'.

Until late Victorian times, Frinton-on-Sea was a church, several farms and a handful of cottages. In the 1890s, the original developer of the town, Peter Bruff, was bought out by the industrialist Richard Powell Cooper, who had already laid out the golf course. Powell Cooper rejected Bruff's plans for a pier, stipulated the quality of housing to be built and prohibited boarding houses and pubs. The Sea Defence Act 1903 established a project to stabilise the cliffs, with the Greensward, which separates the Esplanade from the sea, put in place to stabilise the land further.

In the first half of the 20th century the town attracted visitors from high society. Connaught Avenue, named after the Duke of Connaught and opened by his wife, was nicknamed East Anglia's Bond Street. Other attractions included a lido, complete with palm trees, hotels along the Esplanade, and an amateur tennis tournament. The Prince of Wales (later Edward VII) frequented the golf club and Winston Churchill rented a house. Frinton was the last target in England attacked by the Luftwaffe, in 1944.

The town has a reputation for a conservative nature (although it was in a Labour constituency from 1997 to 2005). Until recently, there were no pubs, although there have long been bars in seafront hotels and at the golf and War Memorial clubs. The first pub, the Lock and Barrel, opened in 2000.

Governance
An electoral ward in the name of Frinton exists. The population of this ward at the 2011 Census was 4,002. On 1 April 1934 the parish was abolished to form "Frinton and Walton".

Geography
Frinton has three points of entry by road: an unadopted road from Walton-on-the-Naze in the north, a residential road, and a CCTV monitored level crossing adjacent to the railway station which replaced the older gated crossing in 2009. Frinton was once geographically distinct, but housing estates now line the roads between Frinton and Walton-on-the-Naze, Kirby Cross and Kirby-Le-Soken.

The town has sandy and stone beach washed daily, more than a mile (1,600 m) long, with wardens in season, and an area of sea zoned for swimming, sailing and windsurfing. The shore is lined by a promenade with several hundred beach huts. Landward from the promenade is a long greensward, popular with young and old alike, stretching from the boundary with Walton-on-Naze to the golf club in the south.

Six miles offshore lies Gunfleet Lighthouse, constructed in 1850 but abandoned in 1921.

Religion
There are two Anglican parish churches: St Mary the Virgin is Norman in parts. The church of St Mary Magdalene was built in 1928 to accommodate worshippers from St Mary the Virgin. Across the road from St Mary Magadalene is the Evangelical Gospel Chapel. Frinton's Catholic church, the Church of the Sacred Heart and St Francis, was built in 1904, as a public hall known as Queen's Hall; the architect was William Hayne. It was acquired as a church in the 1920s. There is also a Methodist church, and a Free church.

Frinton in popular culture
Frinton is home to the Frinton Summer Theatre Season at the McGrigor Hall every summer. Started in 1937, by the Cambridge Academic T. P. Hoar as an amusement whilst he studied corrosion, it quickly developed a life of its own, employing many later famous actors at the start of their career. Michael Denison, Vanessa Redgrave, Timothy West, Jane Asher, David Suchet, Gary Oldman, Owen Teale, Lynda Bellingham, Jack Klaff, Antony Sher and Neil Dudgeon all started their careers at Frinton. For many years it was run by the British actor Jack Watling, and his son Giles and son-in-law Seymour Matthews. His daughters Debbie and Dilys often appeared on stage, as did 'Allo 'Allo! cast member John D. Collins. It is now run by Clive Brill.

Frinton's population of retirees makes it the butt of jokes, with the LNER advertising slogan "Harwich for the Continent" being appended "Frinton for the incontinent". However, its genteel nature has ensured that property 'within the gates' is well sought after.

Frinton was used in a recent Subway Sandwiches commercial for the UK, although the advert was not actually filmed in Frinton.

In Season 1 Episode 2 of the television series Minder Terry says in response to Arthur swearing on his mother's grave that he knows for a fact his mother is alive and well and living in Frinton.

Notable residents
The actor Ross Davidson was living in Frinton-on-Sea at the time of his death in October 2006.

T.E.B. Clarke, novelist and writer of several Ealing comedies, including Passport To Pimlico and The Lavender Hill Mob, lived there as a child.

Disc jockeys Mike Read, Adrian John and David Hamilton lived in the town whilst broadcasting on Big L.

Richard Cobb (1917 - 1996), Professor of Modern History at the University of Oxford, was born in the town.

In the 1920s and 1930s Turret Lodge on the Esplanade was owned by Fritz Dupre, the "manganese ore king", for use as his family's holiday home.

The late Group Captain Alfred 'Ken' Gatward DSO, DFC and bar, who flew a mission to occupied Paris during the Second World War to drop a French Tricolour on the Arc de Triomphe, lived in the town.

Actress Deborah Watling, best known for her role in Doctor Who as a companion to the second Doctor, lived in the town until her death in 2017.

Princeton University's first John T. Maltsberger III, Class of 1955 Associate University Librarian for Special Collections, William G. Noel, grew up in the town in the 1960s and 1970s.

References

External links

Towns in Essex
Seaside resorts in Essex
Populated coastal places in Essex
Beaches of Essex
Tendring